Dreamers Like Us is a studio album by Canadian country music group The Higgins. It was released on June 8, 2010 by Open Road Recordings. The first single was "Free Like Love."

Track listing

External links
[ Dreamers Like Us] at Allmusic

2010 albums
The Higgins albums
Open Road Recordings albums